The 2015–16 Maryland Terrapins men's basketball team represented the University of Maryland, College Park in the 2015–16 NCAA Division I men's basketball season. They were led by fifth year head coach Mark Turgeon and played their home games at Xfinity Center. This was their second year as members of the Big Ten Conference. They finished the season with a record of 27–9, 12–6 in Big Ten play to finish in a four-way tie for third place in conference. They defeated Nebraska in the quarterfinals of the Big Ten tournament to advance to the semifinals where they lost to Michigan State. They received an at-large bid to the NCAA tournament where they defeated South Dakota State and Hawaii to advance to the Sweet Sixteen. In the Sweet Sixteen, they lost to Kansas.

Previous season
The Terrapins finished the 2014–15 season with a record of 28–7, 14–4 in Big Ten play to finish in second place in conference. They advanced to the semifinals of the Big Ten tournament where they lost to Michigan State. They received an at-large bid to the NCAA tournament where they defeated Valparaiso in the Second Round before losing in the Third Round to West Virginia.

Departures

Incoming transfers

Pre-season

2015 recruiting class

Roster

Depth chart

Schedule and results

|-
!colspan=12 style="background:#; color:#;"| Exhibition
|-

|-
!colspan=12 style="background:#; color:#;"| Regular season

|-
!colspan=9 style="background:#;"|Big Ten Regular Season

|-
!colspan=9 style="text-align: center; background:#"|Big Ten tournament

|-
!colspan=9 style="text-align: center; background:#"|NCAA tournament

|-

Rankings

See also
2015–16 Maryland Terrapins women's basketball team

References

External links
 Official website
 Terps at ESPN

Maryland Terrapins men's basketball seasons
Maryland
Maryland
Terra
Terra